The following is a list of people from Huntsville, Alabama:

A
 Viola Allen, actress
 Andrew J. Applegate, first lieutenant governor of Alabama
 Ernest Ashworth, country music singer 
 Christine Auten, voice actress
 Carla Azar, musician

B
 Tallulah Bankhead, actress
 William B. Bankhead, politician 
 Garry Betty, former president and CEO of EarthLink
 Bo Bice, musician
 David B. Birney, Civil War general, abolitionist
 James G. Birney, abolitionist
 William Birney, Civil War general
 Thomas Boyd, football player
 Jed Bradley, Milwaukee Brewers pitcher
 Mo Brooks, politician from Alabama's 5th district
 Michael E. Brown, astronomer
 Tom Butler, politician
 Larry Byrom, musician

C
 Julia Campbell, actress
 Samuel A. Cartwright, physician
 Sheryll D. Cashin, professor
 Reg E. Cathey, actor
 Bobby Cattage, basketball player
 Fred Child, radio host
 Stewart Cink, golfer
 Randolph Royall Claiborne Jr., bishop
 Benjamin L. Clapp, Mormon leader
 Alex Clay, soccer player
 Clement Claiborne Clay, politician
 Jeremiah Clemens, politician
 Kay Cornelius, author
 Robert E. Cramer, politician
 Julia Pleasants Creswell (1827-1886), poet, novelist
 Thomas Turpin Crittenden, Civil War general
 Howard Cross, football player
 Milton K. Cummings, cotton broker and space-defense industry executive

D
 Werner J. A. Dahm, former Chief Scientist of the U.S. Air Force
 Kenneth Darby, football player
 Jan Davis, astronaut
 Felicia Day, actress, writer, director, violinist, and singer
 Grant Dayton, baseball player
 Kim Dickens, actress
 Antoine Dodson, internet celebrity
 Nic Dowd, hockey player 
 Shawn Draper, football player

E
 Bobby Eaton, wrestler

F
 Trey Flowers, football player

G 
 William Willis Garth, politician
 Edward Gillespie, attorney in arms
 John Campbell Greenway, U.S. Army general, Rough Rider, husband of Isabella Greenway
 Parker Griffith, politician

H
 Andrew Jackson Hamilton, politician and military governor of Texas
 Cully Hamner, comic book artist and writer
 Jeffrey S. Harper, educator and author
 John Hendricks, founder and chairman of Discovery Communications
 Dwone Hicks, football player
 Margaret Hoelzer, Olympic swimmer
 Bill Holbrook, comic strip artist and writer
 Condredge Holloway, football player
 Matthew Houck, indie-folk musician
 Donnie Humphrey, football player

J
 Mick Jenkins, hip hop artist
 Walter Jones, football player
 Walter B. Jones, geologist

K
 Joey Kent, football player
 Jimmy Key, baseball player
 Craig Kimbrel, baseball player
 David A. King, former director of Marshall Space Flight Center
 Ralph Knowles, attorney

L
 Trevor Lacey, professional basketball player
 Marc Lacy, author
 Mark Lenzi, Olympic diver
 Clarke Lewis, politician
 William M. Lowe, politician
 Joseph Lowery, civil rights activist
 Michael Luwoye, Broadway actor known for playing the title role in the Broadway musical Hamilton

M
 Ralph Malone, football player
 Chris Martin, football player
 Bo Matthews, football player
 Jordan Matthews, football player
 Ken McBride, baseball player
 Gerald McCullouch, actor
 Paul McDonald, singer
 Spike McRoy, golfer
 Jimmy Means, NASCAR driver
 Izzy Miller, singer/songwriter
 Virginia Miller, heptathlete
 Don Mincher, baseball player
 Rashad Moore, football player
 John H. Moores, politician
 JoAnn H. Morgan, aerospace engineer
 John Hunt Morgan, Civil War general

O
 Amobi Okoye, football player
 Edward A. O'Neal, former governor of Alabama
 David F. O'Neill, naval aviator and major general, U.S. Marine Corps

P
 Thomas George Percy, Alabama settler
 James Phelan Sr., Confederate politician
 John Dennis Phelan, jurist
 Macon Phillips, White House Director of New Media
 Susanna Phillips, opera singer
 Stan Pietkiewicz, basketball player
 LeRoy Pope, Alabama settler
 Paula Poundstone, comedian

R
 Steve Raby, politician
 Reggie Ragland, football player
 Israel Raybon, football player
 James Record, politician
 Brian Reynolds, video game designer 
 Scottie Reynolds, basketball player
 William N. Richardson, politician
 Ramzee Robinson, football player
 Jared Ross, hockey player
 Debby Ryan, actress, singer

S
 Destin Sandlin, YouTuber
 Terri Sewell, politician
 Bryan Shelton, tennis player
 Mark C. Smith, founder of Universal Data Systems
 John Sparkman, politician
 Mark Spencer, computer engineer
 Roy Spencer, climatologist
 Robert L. Spragins, U.S. Army major general
 John Stallworth, football player
 Bennett M. Stewart, politician
 Marvin Stone, basketball player
 Gabby Street, baseball player
 Jayson Swain, football player

T
 Conrad Thompson, podcast host
Kim Tibbs, songwriter
 Cliff Toney, football player
 Nick Torres, songwriter
 Harry Townes, actor, Episcopal priest

V
 Ned Vaughn, actor
 Wernher von Braun, German rocket scientist who lived in Huntsville for 20 years
 Hans A. von Spakovsky, former member of the Federal Election Commission

W
 Jimmy Wales, co-founder of Wikipedia
 John Williams Walker, politician
 LeRoy Pope Walker, Confederate States Secretary of War
 Percy Walker, politician
 Richard Wilde Walker, Confederate politician
 Richard Wilde Walker Jr., former associate justice of the Alabama Supreme Court
 Jonathan Wallace, basketball player
 Mervyn Warren, film and TV composer, music producer, recording artist
 Mario West, basketball player
 Addison White, U.S. Congressman, Confederate Army Officer
 Austin Wiley, Olympian, basketball gold medal, bronze medal
 Kyle Wright, starting pitcher for the Atlanta Braves
 Myron Benjamin Wright, aviator

References

Huntsville
Huntsville, Alabama